Attheya is a genus of small single celled diatoms. Some of these species were earlier regarded to belong to Chaetoceros, or to Gonioceros, the taxonomic status of some of these species are still debated.

Description
They are distinguished morphologically from Chaetoceros by the structure of valve outgrowths or girdle bands. The girdle bands can only be seen with an electron microscope. Resting spores are seldom observed. Vegetative cells tend to attach to different substrates, including other diatoms, and are sometimes referred to as epiphytic. However, they are also observed to be planktonic.

Species
Attheya arenicola C. Gardner & R. M. Crawford
Attheya armata (T. West) R. M. Crawford
Attheya decora T. West
Attheya flexuosa var. enodulifer C. Gardner
Attheya flexuosa C. Gardner
Attheya gaussii (Heiden) R. M. Crawford
Attheya lata Wooszynska
Attheya longicornis R. M. Crawford & C. Gardner
Attheya septentrionalis (Østrup) Crawford
Attheya ussurensis Stonik, Orlova & Crawford
Attheya zachariasii var. curvata P. Rivera
Attheya zachariasii Brun

References

Further reading

External links

Coscinodiscophyceae genera